Hellinsia scholasticus is a moth of the family Pterophoridae. It is found in the Palestinian Territories.

References

Moths described in 1924
scholasticus
Moths of the Middle East
Insects of the Middle East